Jordan Alexander Houghton (born 5 November 1995) is an English professional footballer who plays as a midfielder for League One club Plymouth Argyle.

Club career

Chelsea
Houghton joined Chelsea's academy at Under-8. In November 2014, he signed his first professional contract which would keep him at the club until the end of the 2016–17 season.

Loan to Gillingham
On 20 July 2015, Houghton signed for League One side Gillingham on loan until 3 January 2016. On 8 August 2015, he made his professional debut  in a 4–0 home victory against Sheffield United, playing the full 90 minutes. After establishing himself in the starting 11, Houghton scored his first professional goal in a 5–1 victory over Fleetwood Town on 29 September, also at Priestfield Stadium.

On 2 January 2016, Houghton announced via his social media accounts that Gillingham had decided against extending his loan and that he would return to Chelsea after failing to impress under manager Justin Edinburgh.

Loan to Plymouth Argyle
On 10 March 2016, Houghton signed for League Two side Plymouth Argyle on loan. Two days later, he made his "Pilgrims" debut in a 2–1 away defeat to Accrington Stanley, playing the full 90 minutes. On 25 March, he scored his first Plymouth goal in the 14th minute of a 2–0 away victory against Morecambe.

Loan to Doncaster Rovers
On 6 August 2016, it was announced that Houghton will join Doncaster Rovers on loan until 3 January 2017. After the loan move was completed, Houghton made his debut as he started against Accrington Stanley in a 3–2 loss. His loan deal was extended till the end of the season on 1 January 2017. On 1 January 2017, the loan deal got extended once more, this time until 31 May 2017. On 21 February 2017, Houghton's loan spell was terminated after the midfielder suffered a knee injury during Doncaster's 1–1 draw with Luton Town on 18 February.

On 31 August 2017, Houghton returned to Doncaster on loan until 3 January 2018. Two days later, he made his Doncaster return during their 0–0 draw with Peterborough United, replacing Niall Mason in the 59th minute. On 5 January 2018, Houghton's loan spell at Doncaster was extended until the end of the campaign.

Milton Keynes Dons

On 6 July 2018, following his release from Chelsea, Houghton signed for League Two club Milton Keynes Dons on a two-year deal. He scored his first goal for the club on 27 October 2018, a long range strike in a 1–1 draw away to Mansfield Town. Following three seasons, a promotion and 107 appearances for the club, on 6 May 2021, MK Dons announced Houghton was one of four players to be released at the end of the 2020–21 season.

Plymouth Argyle 
On 25 June 2021, Houghton signed for League One side Plymouth Argyle on a permanent basis after his last spell at the club five years ago. Following the 2021–22 season, the club opted to have the extension option on his contract extended.

Career statistics

Honours
Chelsea
FA Youth Cup: 2013–14

Doncaster Rovers
EFL League Two third-place promotion: 2016–17

Milton Keynes Dons
EFL League Two third-place promotion: 2018–19

England U16
Victory Shield: 2010

References

External links
England profile at The FA

1995 births
Living people
Sportspeople from Chertsey
English footballers
Association football defenders
Chelsea F.C. players
Gillingham F.C. players
Plymouth Argyle F.C. players
Doncaster Rovers F.C. players
Milton Keynes Dons F.C. players
English Football League players
England youth international footballers
Footballers from Surrey